"Blue Hawaii" is a popular song written by Leo Robin and Ralph Rainger for the 1937 Paramount Pictures film Waikiki Wedding, starring Bing Crosby and Shirley Ross. Crosby recorded a version with backing by Lani McIntyre and His Hawaiians, which was released in 1937 as the B-side of "Sweet Leilani." This reached the No. 5 spot in the charts of the day during a 13-week-stay 

The song subsequently received numerous cover versions, most successfully as the title track of the 1961 Elvis Presley film, the soundtrack of which stayed at #1 on the album chart for twenty consecutive weeks.

Other recordings
Al Bowlly – (1937)
Bing Crosby – Decca 1175 (1937). Crosby also recorded the song for the album Bing: A Musical Autobiography in 1954.
Patti Page – Page 3 – A Collection of Her Most Famous Songs (1957 album)
Billy Vaughn – Dot Records 45-15879 (1958): This recording peaked at No.37 on the US Hot 100.
Frank Sinatra – Come Fly with Me (1958)
Andy Williams – Two Time Winners (1959) and To You Sweetheart, Aloha (1959)
George Greeley – Warner Bros. Records WS-1366 (1960)
Jane Morgan – Jane Morgan Sings More Golden Hits Kapp Records KL-1275 (1961)
Elvis Presley – Blue Hawaii (1961)
Pat Boone with Shirley Boone – I Love You Truly (1962)
Willie Nelson – Honeymoon in Vegas (1992)
Suburban Rhythm – Suburban Rhythm (1997)
David Byrne – Big Love: Hymnal (2008)

References

Songs about Hawaii
1937 songs
1961 singles
Pop ballads
Songs with music by Ralph Rainger
Songs with lyrics by Leo Robin
Songs written for films
Elvis Presley songs
Frank Sinatra songs
Bing Crosby songs
David Byrne songs
Andy Williams songs
Al Bowlly songs